Several ships of the United States Navy have been named USS Grouse, after the grouse.

  formerly New Bol, was launched in 1938
  launched 20 February 1943
 USS Grouse (AM-398) was begun at the Defoe Shipbuilding Company in Bay City, Michigan, but her construction contract was terminated 12 August 1945

United States Navy ship names